Branchini is a tribe of darkling beetles in the subfamily Pimeliinae of the family Tenebrionidae. There are at least three genera in Branchini.

Genera
These genera belong to the tribe Branchini
 Anectus Horn, 1867  (the Neotropics)
 Branchus Leconte, 1862  (North America and the Neotropics)
 Oxinthas Champion, 1884  (the Neotropics)

References

Further reading

 
 

Tenebrionoidea